The Sambas riots were an outbreak of inter-ethnic violence in Indonesia, in 1999. The conflict started in the regency of Sambas, West Kalimantan Province. The conflict involved Malay allying with the indigenous Dayak people in order to massacre the migrant Madurese from the island of Madura.

Background
The Sambas riots in 1999 were not an isolated incident, as there had been previous incidents of violence between the Dayaks and the Madurese. The last major conflict occurred between December 1996 and January 1997, and resulted in more than 600 deaths. The Madurese first arrived in Borneo in 1930 under the transmigration program initiated by the Dutch colonial administration, and continued by the Indonesian government.

Massacres
Malays and Dayaks united to massacre Madurese  in Sambas district. Madurese were mutilated, raped, and killed by the Malays and Dayaks and 3,000 of them died in the massacres, with the Indonesian government doing little to stop the violence. Malays and Dayaks attacked Indonesian troops sent to stop the riots.

Further massacres
In 2001, Dayaks launched another massacre of several hundred Madurese in the Sampit conflict.

See also
 Transmigration program
 Sampit conflict
 2010 Tarakan riot, a much smaller scale riot between Dayak Tidung and Bugis people in Tarakan
 Fall of Suharto

References

External links
 Tempo - Mereka Lari ke Malaysia
 Tali Kepala Merah Kembali Dikenakan
 
 Reformasi dan Persatuan Nasional: 1998 to 2001
 PERANG SAMPIT MADURA
 Severed Heads and Violence Against Madurese in Borneo

1999 in Indonesia
History of West Kalimantan
Riots and civil disorder in Indonesia
Headhunting
Ethnic riots
1999 riots
Ethnic conflicts in Indonesia